CRU Group is a privately owned business intelligence company. The company focuses on the global mining, metals and fertilizers markets. It provides consultancy, market analysis, business analysis, news, data and conferences services.

Global Coverage

CRU's headquarters are in central London. The company also has regional offices in: 
 Beijing – China
 Shanghai - China 
 Santiago – Chile 
 Mumbai – India
 Singapore
 Pittsburgh – United States 
 Sydney – Australia

CRU employs over 260 people from a range of disciplines: economists, management consultants, engineers, metallurgists, geologists, chemists and journalists.

The company was originally named Commodities Research Unit. It was changed to CRU as the company expanded their offering to include more than just research products.

Over the years CRU have made a number of acquisitions including: 
 1986 – British Sulphur Consultants
 1996 – Resource Strategies Inc
 2006 – Commodity Metals Management Company
 2012 - Ryan's Notes with the acquisition of Nonferrous Notes Organization
 2012 – Fertecon Research Centre – phosphates and sulphur analysis and consultancy business

Commodities

CRU specializes in producing short-, medium-, and long-term analysis for major commodities including: 
 Aluminium
 Alumina
 Bauxite
 Ferromanganese
 Ferrosilicon
 Manganese
 Silicon 
 Carbon Steel (Billet, Crude, Longs, Pipes and Tubes, Plate, Sheet, Slab)
 Copper
 Ferrochrome
 Lead
 Cobalt
 Uranium 
 Nickel
 Nitrogen 
 Ammonia 
 UAN 
 Urea 
 Phosphates 
 Phosphate Rock
 Potash 
 Gold 
 Silver 
 Stainless Steel 
 Metallurgical Coal
 Thermal (Steaming) Coal
 Iron Ore 
 Metallics
 Metallurgical Coke
 Sulphur 
 Sulphuric Acid 
 Tin 
 Wire and Cable
 Zinc

References

External links
 Official website

Privately held companies of the United Kingdom
Macroeconomics consulting firms